Quinn Fawcett is the pen name of a pair of authors, Chelsea Quinn Yarbro and Bill Fawcett, who also write separately. Among their collaborations are a series of mysteries featuring Victoire Vernet, fictional wife of one of Napoleon's generals; a series featuring Sherlock Holmes's brother Mycroft; and a series fictionalizing the espionage experiences of James Bond creator Ian Fleming.

Bibliography

Mme. Vernet books
Napoleon Must Die (1993)
Death Wears a Crown (1993)

Mycroft Holmes books
Against The Brotherhood (1997)
Embassy Row (1998)
The Flying Scotsman (1999)
The Scottish Ploy (2000)

Ian Fleming books
Death to Spies (2002)
Siren Song (2003)
Honor Among Spies (2004)

References

20th-century American novelists
21st-century American novelists
American crime fiction writers
Collective pseudonyms